The Martyrs of Carthage under Valerian were a group of Christians including Montanus, Lucius, Flavian, Julian, Victoricus, Primolus, Rhenus, and Donatian who were executed during the persecutions of the Roman Emperor Valerian in 259 AD.
Their feast day is 24 February.

Source

The martyrs wrote a letter, which was the basis for part of the account of their martyrdom, and an eye-witness also left testimony.
Alban Butler states that they are published more correctly by Thierry Ruinart than by Laurentius Surius and Jean Bolland.
Their account has been reproduced at length by several hagiographers.

Monks of Ramsgate account

The monks of St Augustine's Abbey, Ramsgate wrote in their Book of Saints (1921),

Butler's account

The hagiographer Alban Butler (1710–1773) wrote in his Lives of the Fathers, Martyrs, and Other Principal Saints under February 24, 

Sabine Baring-Gould (1834–1924) gives a near-identical version of the above in his Lives Of The Saints.

Notes

Sources

 

 

Saints from Roman Africa (province)
259 deaths